Moi, fleur bleue is a 1977 French film directed by Éric Le Hung.

The film is sometimes known in English as "Stop Calling Me Baby!". It starred 15-year-old Jodie Foster as Isabelle Tristran, nicknamed "Fleur bleue".

A private detective locates his client's love interest and has relations with her and her young sister.

Cast 
 Jodie Foster as Isabelle Tristan
 Sydne Rome as Sophie Tristan
 Jean Yanne as Max
 Bernard Giraudeau as Isidore
 Lila Kedrova as Madame de Tocquenville
 Odette Laure as Olga
 Claude Gensac as La directrice
 Marthe Villalonga as La patronne du café

References

1977 films
1977 romantic comedy films
French romantic comedy films
1970s French-language films
1970s French films